One-Thing-at-a-Time O'Day is a lost 1919 American silent comedy film, directed by John Ince. It stars Bert Lytell, Joseph Kilgour, and Eileen Percy, and was released on June 23, 1919.

Cast
 Bert Lytell as Stradivarius O'Day
 Joseph Kilgour as Charley Carstock
 Eileen Percy as Prairie-Flower Marie
 Stanton Heck as Gorilla Lawson
 William A. Carroll as MacLeod
 Jules Hanft as Billings
 John Hack as Roughneck M'Dool
 Bull Montana

References

External links 
 
 
 

Films directed by John Ince
Metro Pictures films
American silent feature films
Silent American comedy films
1919 comedy films
1919 films
Lost American films
1919 lost films
Lost comedy films
1910s English-language films
1910s American films